aKING is a South African melodic rock band based in Bellville, and also a suburb of Cape Town. The band was formed in November 2007 by Hunter Kennedy and Jaco 'Snakehead' Venter, both members of the Bellville-based Fokofpolisiekar, in collaboration with Laudo Liebenberg (vocals and guitar) and Hennie van Halen (bass).

History

The band's first studio album, Dutch Courage debuted in 2008, followed by their second album, Against All Odds in early 2009. The band have toured extensively throughout South Africa, playing at major festivals such as Oppikoppi Music Festival and Coke Zero Fest in 2009, where they shared the stage with international acts Oasis, Snow Patrol and Panic! at the Disco. The band has been playlisted on major South African radio stations, including 5fm, Kfm and campus radio stations nationwide. 

In 2009, aKING flew to Argentina to shoot the music video for their single, "You and I". Towards the end of 2008, the band recorded three songs for a project entitled "In The Twilight", which they did in collaboration with Cape Town-based production company Ghetto Vibrations, Khayelitsha United Mambaso and the Thokozani Brothers. aKING is associated with brother bands Fokofpolisiekar, the electronic group Die Heuwels Fantasties, and Van Coke Kartel, who often play together as part of their concept project, VanFokKingTasties. In early 2010, Andrew Davenport, a vocalist, bassist and friend of the band, replaced Hunter Kennedy on guitar.  The band released their third studio album The Red Blooded Years in March 2011. The band were featured on the SABC 2 soap opera 7de Laan in early October 2015.

Band members

Current members
 Laudo Liebenberg – vocals, rhythm guitar 
 Hennie van Halen – bass guitar 
 Jaco "Snakehead" Venter – drums 
 Andrew Davenport – guitar

Former members
 Hunter Kennedy – guitar, vocals

Discography 
Dutch Courage (LP, 2008)
In The Twilight (EP, 2009)
Against All Odds (LP, 2009)
The Red Blooded Years (LP, 2011)
Morning After (LP, 2014)

References

External links 
 
 aKING discography and lyrics
 aKing on Last.fm

South African rock music groups
South African musical groups
2007 establishments in South Africa